The Despotate of Arta was a despotate established by Albanian rulers during the 14th century, after the defeat of the local Despot of Epirus, Nikephoros II Orsini, by Albanian tribesmen in the Battle of Achelous in 1359 and ceased to exist in 1416, when it passed to Carlo I Tocco.

History

Creation
In the late spring of 1359, Nikephoros II Orsini, the last despot of Epirus of the Orsini dynasty, fought against the Albanians near river Acheloos, Aetolia. The Albanians won the battle and managed to create two new states in the southern territories of the Despotate of Epirus. Because a number of Albanian lords actively supported the successful Serbian campaign in Thessaly and Epirus, the Serbian Tsar granted them specific regions and offered them the Byzantine title of despotes in order to secure their loyalty.

By the late 1360s, two Albanian principalities had emerged: the first with its capital in Arta under Peter Losha, and the second, centered in Angelokastron, under Gjin Bua Spata. After the death of Peter Losha in 1374, the Albanian despotates of Arta and Angelocastron were united under the rule of Gjin Bua Spata.

At April 1378 the Grand Master of the Knights Hospitaller, Juan Fernández de Heredia set about to take Arta but failed and was captured in battle by Gjin Bua Spata. Herendia was sold by Spata to the Ottoman Turks for a huge prize. Thomas II Preljubović, the Despot of Epirus offered valuable help during the battle, however this alliance didn't last for long.

The territory of this despotate at its greatest extent (1374–1403) was from the Corinth Gulf to Acheron River in the North, neighboring with the Principality of Gjirokastër of John Zenevisi, another state created in the area of the Despotate of Epirus. The Despotate of Epirus managed to control in this period only the eastern part of Epirus, with its capital in Ioannina. During this period the Despot of Epirus Thomas II Preljubović was in an open conflict with Gjin Spata. In 1375, Gjin Bua Spata started an offensive in Ioannina, but he could not invade the city. Although Spata married with Thomas' sister, Helena, their war did not stop.

Fall of the Despotate
After the death of Gjin Bua Spata in 1399, the Despotate of Arta weakened continuously, and the Spata Family was involved in civil war. Among the animosities with the rulers of Ioannina Gjin's successor, Maurice Spata, had to deal with the intentions of the Venetians and of Count Carlo I Tocco of Cefalonia. Meanwhile, Ottoman incursions were intensified as they were occasionally called by despot Esau de' Buondelmonti of the Despotate of Epirus. After the death of de' Buondelmonti in 1411, the throne was offered to his nephew, Carlo I Tocco. Even though his gain was accompanied by a great loss that the forces of John Zenevisi's inflicted upon his army, he would later subject the leaders of southern Albania. In spite of Maurice's victory over Carlo in 1412, the Albanians failed to take Ioannina. On the contrary, not long after killing Maurice in battle in 1414–1415, Carlo advanced on Arta. In 1416, he defeated Yaqub Spata and conquered Arta thus annexing the Despotate.

Local legacy
The city of Arta was relatively unknown during the period of the Albanian rule (1358–1416). The Albanian leaders, not accustomed to living in cities, as mountaineers, acquired legally Byzantine titles and tried to adopt Byzantine state structure. Although no architectural activity has been reported for this period, little seems to have changed in Arta and the Albanian and Greek population coexisted peacefully in the city.

Despots

Losha Dynasty
Peter Losha

Shpata Dynasty
Gjin Bua Spata
Sgouros Spata
Maurice Spata
Yaqub Spata

See also
 Albanian principalities
 History of Albania

References

 
Former countries in the Balkans
Albanian principalities